KAMJ (93.9 FM) is a radio station licensed to Gosnell, Arkansas, United States. The station is owned by Phoenix Broadcasting Group.

References

External links

KAMJ Gosnell (Legal ID)

AMJ
Mainstream urban radio stations in the United States